Massachusetts Route 12 is a  north-south state highway that runs through central Massachusetts from a continuation of Connecticut Route 12 at the Connecticut state line at Dudley to the New Hampshire state line at Winchendon where it continues north as New Hampshire Route 12.

Route description
Route 12 begins at the Connecticut border, from which it continues south as Connecticut Route 12, in Dudley. The route initially proceeds northward along the western side of the French River. After , it intersects Route 197 and turns northeast, crossing the river into Webster. The route passes through the town center, before intersecting Route 16 immediately west of its junction with Interstate 395, as well as Route 193. From the intersection, the route runs northward, closely parallel to the Interstate Highway. After branching off, Route 12 remains parallel to US 20 until it meets an interchange connecting the Massachusetts Turnpike (Interstate 90) with Interstates 290 and 395. After indirectly encountering a single southbound exit ramp from I-290, Route 12 crosses the Interstate and turns in a more northerly direction, then receives a ramp that allows northbound traffic from I-395 to access the Turnpike via Route 12. The route then crosses the Turnpike and passes the Auburn Mall, continuing alongside I-290 into Worcester.

Through Worcester, Route 12 follows a series of turns that take it west of the city center. Shortly after entering Worcester, Route 12 turns west as Hope Avenue, crossing I-290 at an incomplete interchange. From the interchange it forms the southern and western boundaries of Hope Cemetery, as it turns north on Webster Street. The route crosses through Webster Square as Mill Street, then joins Route 9 as Park Avenue. The two routes head northeast, crossing Route 122 and beginning an additional concurrency with Route 122A. Route 9 later diverges eastward onto Highland Avenue, while Routes 12 and 122A continue northeast on Park Avenue. After passing the Worcester Polytechnic Institute and the American Antiquarian Society, the routes turn northward and intersect Grove Street. Route 122A departs westward on Grove Street, while Route 12 continues north as a pair of wide one-way roads: Gold Star Boulevard northbound and West Boylston Street southbound. The pair encounter an interchange with Interstate 190 next to the Greendale Mall, after which West Boylston Street carries both directions of Route 12, continuing north past Quinsigamond Community College. Just before leaving the city, Route 12 meets a set of ramps connecting to I-190 once again.

Route 12 proceeds north into West Boylston, meeting Route 140 near the town center. The two routes cross the western arm of the Wachusett Reservoir and pass the Old Stone Church, after which Route 140 departs to the northwest, while Route 12 soon after reaches the western terminus of Route 110. Heading north from the reservoir, Route 12 enters Sterling and meets Route 62, sharing a brief concurrency in the town center. Towards the north, Route 12 crosses I-190 at an interchange and continues into Leominster, where it intersects Route 117 just before reaching the city center. North of downtown, Route 12 intersects Route 13 and later meets Route 2 at an interchange, after which passes Fitchburg Municipal Airport and heads northwest into Fitchburg. Route 12 joins Route 2A just south of downtown Fitchburg, and the two routes pass the city center on the opposite side of the North Nashua River. Following the river, Routes 12 and 2A head west and join Route 31 in a triple concurrency. The three routes continue southwest along the river into West Fitchburg, where Route 12 separates from Routes 2A and 31 and turns northwest, passing through the northeast corner of Westminster and into Ashburnham. After crossing Route 101 in the town center, Route 12 continues northwest into Winchendon, encountering the northern terminus of Route 140 before intersecting U.S. Route 202 in the town center. The route ends in Winchendon at the New Hampshire border, beyond which it continues as New Hampshire Route 12 into Fitzwilliam.

History

Route 12 has a junction with Interstate 90 (the Massachusetts Turnpike) at an interchange in Auburn that also includes Interstates 290 and 395 and US 20. Route 12 has an interchange with I-290 in Worcester, and three interchanges with I-190, in Worcester, West Boylston, and Sterling. Route 12 is a minor road in Massachusetts, having been replaced by I-395 from the Connecticut state line to Auburn, I-290 from Auburn to Worcester, and I-190 from Worcester to Leominster.

Major intersections

See also

New England Interstate Route 12

References

External links

012